Chaetothyriomycetidae is a subclass of fungi within the Eurotiomycetes. They are collectively termed the black yeasts.

References 

 Geiser DM, Gueidan C, Miadlikowska J, Lutzoni F, Kauff F, Hofstetter V, Fraker E, Schoch CL, Tibell L, Untereiner WA, Aptroot A, 2006. Eurotiomycetes: Eurotiomycetidae and Chaetothyriomycetidae. Mycologia 98, 1053–1064.

Eurotiomycetes